Ghanaian rapper Sarkodie has released five studio albums, one collaborative album and one live album.

Discography

Studio albums

Live albums

Music videos

Videography

Singles released
Makye singles
Lay Away Rap 
Borga Rap 
Push
Babe 
Rapperholic singles
Good Bye
One Time for Your Mind
You Go Kill Me
Living Legend
Onyame Nhyra
Sarkology singles
Gunshot
Illuminati
Lies 
Bounce 
Down on One 
Pon D Ting
Ordinary Love 
Preach
Highest singles
Silence ft. Suli Breaks
Overdose ft Jesse Jagz, 
Come To Me ft. Bobii Lewis
We No Dey Fear ft. Jayso
Love Yourself ft. Moelogo
Far Away ft.  Korede Bello
Your Waist ft. Flavour
Glory ft. Yung L
Pain Killer ft. Runtown,
All Night ft. Victoria Kimani 
All I Want Is You ft. Praize
See Only You ft. Jayso
Baby Mama ft. Joey B
Interlude - Highest Part 3-ft  Suli Breaks
Interlude - Highest Part 2-ft  Suli Breaks
Light It Up - ft Big Narstie & Jayso
Certified - ft. Jayso & Worlasi
Black Love singles
Saara ft. Efya
Cant Let You Go ft. King Promise, 
Lucky ft. Rudebwoy
Party & Bullshit ft. Idris Elba & Donaeo
Do You ft. Mr.Eazi

Other singles
These are some of the singles released by Sarkodie.
Revenge of the Spartans
New Guy (song) 
Love Rocks 
Shots on Shots
Oluwa Is Involved
Adonai Remix 
Whine fi me
Chingum 
Megye wo girl 
You Go Kill Me remix
Inflation 
Talk of Gh
Broke Niggas
Thank You 
Ask Dumelo
Biibi Ba
Rush Hour
Bumper
Oofeets)
Year Of Return
 Fa Hooki Me
Ceo flow 
Overload
Happy Day
No Fugazy

References

Hip hop discographies
Discographies of Ghanaian artists